Chandu is a 2002 Kannada romantic-drama film directed by Arun Prasad P.A. featuring Sudeep and Sonia Agarwal. The film features background score and soundtrack composed by Gurukiran and lyrics by K. Kalyan, Anant Kumar and V. Nagendra Prasad. The film released on 10 May 2002.

Plot 
A reckless guy named Chandu (Sudeep) has to deal with the misunderstanding between him and his lover Vidya(Sonia).

Cast
 Sudeep as Chandrashekar "Chandu"
 Sonia Agarwal as Vidya
 Siri as Sowmya, Vidya's cousin
 Srinath as Vidya's father
 Ramesh Bhat as Kumar, Chandu's brother-in-law
 Lohithaswa as Chandu's father
 Avinash as Swathi's father
 Arun Sagar as Clinton, Chandu's friend
 Sadhu Kokila as Thimma, servant
 Umashree as Mary, women's hostel warden
 Chitra Shenoy as Vidya's mother
 Sana as Chandu's sister
 Chethan as Soori
 Amoolya as Akki, Chandu's daughter-in-law
 Kishan Shrikanth as Bablu, Chandu's son-in-law (credited as Master Kishan)
 Amulya as child artist

Soundtrack

The music was composed by Gurukiran for Ashwini Audio label.

References

External links
 

2002 films
2000s Kannada-language films
Films scored by Gurukiran
Films directed by P. A. Arun Prasad